"Away with the learning of clerks, away with it!" was a rallying cry of rebellious townspeople during the Peasants' Revolt of 1381 in Cambridge, during which they sacked the university and official buildings and burnt legal documents and charters en masse. The call is usually ascribed to Margery (sometimes Margaret) Starre. Starre is generally described as an "old woman", although she has also been characterised as a beldam.

The Peasants' Revolt in Cambridge

On 15 June, 1381, revolt broke out in Cambridgeshire, led by a gang from Suffolk and local men who had been involved in the London riots and had returned to spread unrest. The University of Cambridge was staffed by priests and enjoyed special royal privileges, which bred resentment among the lay inhabitants of the town. The Mayor of Cambridge led the rebellion and one of the first major incidents was against the university. The university's library and archives were burnt in the centre of the town.

The historian Barrie Dobson has noted the popularity of burning charters, "records and writings in the house of justice" and other legal records during the Peasants' Revolt. Corpus Christi College – which had close links with the unpopular John of Gaunt— was sacked on 15 June and a number of chests containing the college's muniments were removed. The university was particularly unpopular in Cambridge because it took a heavy-handed role in the town's policing, and because its scholars received benefit of clergy which effectively exempted them from lay courts.

On 16 June, the mob destroyed university documents on a bonfire in Market Square. In what Juliet Barker has described as one of the more picaresque moments of the revolt, Starre scattered the ashes to the four winds, crying out "away with the learning of clerks, away with it!" as she did so, dancing triumphantly with the mob.

Starre may not have been averse to literacy itself, suggests the Chaucerian Susanne Sara Thomas, as much as the oppressive bonds charters represented, and they may have been more generally a symbol of "the establishment". The historian Edmund King has suggested that the episode illustrates that Starre and her cohorts did not realise "how little learning is to be found in most official university documents", while the medievalist Alastair Dunn has questioned whether the tale of Margery Starre's may, in fact, be the stuff of legend. In any case, although part of what Barker has called a "summer of blood" and "a general riot of destruction and death", Starre destroyed property but did not kill anyone, although a later attempt was made on the life of the University bedel. Starre achieved, said Dan Jones, a "brief notoriety" even at a time of general notoriety, and that her "spirit of jubilant vandalism" pervaded the entire city.

In medieval culture
Thomas has suggested that Starre was something of a precursor to Geoffrey Chaucer's character The Wife of Bath of The Canterbury Tales (c. 1387–1400), who rips pages out of her husband's book and then later makes him burn it, while Dorothy Colmer has suggested that she reflects the "political dissatisfactions of the age" as represented by Starre in 1381. Thomas Shippey has drawn comparisons with Shakespeare's followers of Jack Cade, in Henry VI, Part 3, and their exhortation to "kill all the lawyers".

Notes

References

Bibliography 

 
 
 
 
 
 
 
 
 
 
 
 
 
 
 
 
 , Full text online
 
 
 
 

Peasants' Revolt
Book burnings
History of the University of Cambridge
History of Cambridge
1381 in England